Platax pinnatus, also known as the pinnate spadefish, pinnate batfish, pinnatus batfish, dusky batfish, shaded batfish, or red-faced batfish is a fish from the western Pacific that occasionally is kept in marine aquariums.

Description
As a juvenile it is blackish brown, or black with an orange stripe outlining its entire body. Adults become a dull silver.

Importance to humans

In the aquarium
The pinnate batfish is occasionally kept in marine aquariums.

In the wild
Platax pinnatus has been observed to significantly reduce algal growths on coral in studies simulating overfishing on the Great Barrier Reef.

References

fishbase Page on Platax pinnatus 
page on Platax pinnatus
about.com page on Platax pinnatus

External links
 

Ephippidae
Fish of the Pacific Ocean
Fish described in 1758
Taxa named by Carl Linnaeus